The Jerome National Bank is a building located in Jerome, Idaho, United States, listed on the National Register of Historic Places. It was built in 1920–21 in the neo-classic revival style.  The exterior is covered by white terra cotta.

See also

 List of National Historic Landmarks in Idaho
 National Register of Historic Places listings in Jerome County, Idaho

References

1920 establishments in Idaho
Bank buildings on the National Register of Historic Places in Idaho
Buildings and structures in Jerome County, Idaho
Commercial buildings completed in 1920
National Register of Historic Places in Jerome County, Idaho
Neoclassical architecture in Idaho